Mobaye Mbanga Airport  is an airport serving Mobaye, a town on the Ubangi River in the Basse-Kotto prefecture of the Central African Republic.

See also

Transport in the Central African Republic
List of airports in the Central African Republic

References

External links 
OurAirports - Mobaye Mbanga Airport
FallingRain - Mobaye Mbanga Airport

Airports in the Central African Republic
Buildings and structures in Basse-Kotto